The Panié litter skink (Caledoniscincus orestes) is a species of lizard in the family Scincidae. It is endemic to New Caledonia.

References

Caledoniscincus
Skinks of New Caledonia
Endemic fauna of New Caledonia
Reptiles described in 1987
Taxa named by Ross Allen Sadlier